Kamil Mihail Sobota (born 31 March 1992) is a Romanian rugby union football player. He plays as a number 8 for professional Liga Națională de Rugby club Steaua București.

Club career

Kamil Sobota started playing rugby in his hometown of Cluj-Napoca at Universitatea but finished his junior years in Bucharest at Dinamo. His first professional club was Dinamo, joining the senior squad after ending his junior years. For a brief period of time he returned to Universitatea Cluj, moving after one season once again in Bucharest, this time joining CSM. After 4 seasons with CSM București he transferred to Tomitanii Constanța in 2019 following the dissolution of his former club.

International career
Sobota is also selected for Romania's national team, the Oaks, making his international debut during the Week 2 of 2020 Rugby Europe Championship in a test match against the Os Lobos.

References

External links

1992 births
Living people
Sportspeople from Cluj-Napoca
Romanian rugby union players
Romania international rugby union players
CS Dinamo București (rugby union) players
CS Universitatea Cluj-Napoca (rugby union) players
CSM București (rugby union) players
ACS Tomitanii Constanța players
Rugby union locks